Milanković is a Serbian surname derived from the masculine given name Milanko. It may refer to:

 Milutin Milanković (1879–1958), Serbian mathematician, astronomer, and geophysicist
 Nikola Milanković (born 1986), Serbian footballer
 Veljko Milanković (1955–1993), Serbian war commander

See also
 1605 Milankovitch, an asteroid
 Milankovič (lunar crater)
 Milankovič (Martian crater)
 Milankovitch cycles, periodic changes in the orbital movements of the earth

Serbian surnames